Abdul Rahman Bukhatir is an Emirati businessman, media entrepreneur, and cricket administrator. He is the founder of Bukhatir Group which has business interests in construction, education, information technology, real estate, shopping, sports and leisure sectors. He also founded the sports TV channel Ten Sports. He is known as Kerry Packer of Gulf region. He was the founder of Cricketers Benefit Fund Series, which aimed to benefit retired cricketers from Indian subcontinent. He is the father of Nasheed singer Ahmed Bukhatir.

Early life 
Abdul Rahman Bukhatir is born in an Arab family. Bukhatir studied in BVS Parsi School in Karachi, Pakistan. While studying, he was introduced to cricket by his neighbours in Karachi. When he came back to UAE, he got a few like-minded people together and started playing cricket on matting wickets.

Career

Cricket patron 
He transformed Sharjah Cricket Stadium, from a stadium in desert, to one of the historic and Guinness Book of World Records-holder cricket ground. In 1981, he organised cricket match between Gavaskar XI and Miandad XI.

He helped set up Al Dhaid Cricket Village. He also served as the chairman of the Emirates Cricket Board.

Media 
In January 2001, Bukhatir founded Taj Television Ltd. in Dubai. The company launched the TV channel TEN Sports (as part of its Taj Entertainment Network), dedicated to sports on 1 April 2002. Zee Telefilms (Essel Group) bought 50 percent stake in TEN Sports at an enterprise value of $114 million (800 crore) in 2006 and completely acquired it in 2010.

Awards 
In February 2018, he received Lifetime Achievement Award category in the Shyam Bhatia Annual Awards.

References 

Emirati businesspeople
Year of birth missing (living people)
Living people